These are the official results of the Men's Javelin Throw event at the 1993 World Championships in Stuttgart, Germany. There were a total of 47 participating athletes, with the final held on Monday August 16, 1993. All results were made with rough surfaced javelin. The qualification mark was set at 81.00 metres.

Doping disqualification
The original bronze medalist Dmitriy Polyunin (Uzbekistan) was disqualified for doping after his sample was found positive for the anabolic steroid stanozolol, and the medal was instead awarded Mick Hill (Great Britain).

Medalists

Schedule
All times are Central European Time (UTC+1)

Abbreviations
All results shown are in metres

Records

Qualification

Group A

Group B

Final

See also
 1992 Men's Olympic Javelin Throw (Barcelona)
 1994 Men's European Championships Javelin Throw (Helsinki)
 1996 Men's Olympic Javelin Throw (Atlanta)

References

 Results
 koti.welho
 IAAF

J
Javelin throw at the World Athletics Championships